Onychostoma macrolepis is a species of cyprinid in the genus Onychostoma.

References

macrolepis
Cyprinid fish of Asia
Freshwater fish of China
Fish described in 1871